Triggered is a South African horror-comedy film co-written and directed by Alastair Orr. The film stars Reine Swart, Liesl Ahlers, Cameron Scott and Russell Crous as part of an ensemble of nine friends who find themselves strapped to suicide bomb vests by a former teacher, forcing the group to kill each other until there is one left.

Plot

A group of former high school friends reunite for a camping trip. The group includes valedictorian Rian (Reine Swart) and her boyfriend PJ (Cameron Scott), a rock drummer; popular Ezra (Steven John Ward), wallflower Erin (Liesl Ahlers), couple Shay (Suraya Rose dos Santos) and Bobby (Michael Lawrence Potter), best friends Amber (Paige Bonnin) and Cici (Kayla Privett), and the brooding Kato (Russell Crous). As the group attempts to turn in for the night, they are knocked out by gas placed by a mysterious figure and Erin, who discovers the gas, is knocked out. The nine awaken and find themselves strapped to suicide bomb vests.

The man responsible is Mr. Peterson (Sean Cameron Michael), the group's former science teacher. He confronts the group, as he holds them responsible for the death of his son Caleb, who died of a drug overdose at a party. He sets off various timers on each student's vest and proceeds to kill himself in front of the group. When they find a battered Bobby, who had been separated from the group, it's revealed that he helped Mr. Peterson and was responsible for the group going to the woods. Bobby apologizes, explaining that he was blackmailed by Peterson, but it is too late and the vest explodes, killing him.

After Bobby, PJ has the lowest time and begs Rian to help. However, when he is startled by Shay, he accidentally kills her with a high impact blow to the head with his flashlight. He and Rian discover Shay's time has been added to PJ's vest, thus giving him the highest time. Rian tells the group about what had happened and that he got the time because of "proximity sensors". When Cici has the next lowest score, she goes insane and goes after the group. When Cici learns Amber had been sleeping with Ezra thanks to Kato telling her, Amber defends herself and kills her best friend. Kato convinces Amber to ally with him to kill the others so they can be the last ones standing.

Ezra convinces Erin to team up with him and the two find a man bloodied and tied up in the forest. Erin recognizes him as Detective Miller, Rian's father. Miller tells the two that Peterson forced him to reopen Caleb's case and had strapped him to a vest as well. As he is mortally wounded, Ezra kills Miller, but since Erin is the closest one, she gets his time. Ezra did it as the first selfless act he's done as he has had a reputation as a selfish playboy type. As Erin looks for Rian, Kato, now gone insane, kills Ezra as revenge for Amber. Erin finds Rian and tells her about her father's ordeal.

Meanwhile, Kato shoots PJ in the head and then betrays Amber for sleeping with Ezra and chops her repeatedly with an axe. When Rian attempts to turn the vest off, it leads to a sudden death situation between her, Erin, and Kato. Rian then is ready to kill Erin but breaks down and confesses that she is the one who killed Caleb. She admits to slipping ecstasy given to her by Kato at Ezra's party five years ago because he had a higher GPA than her and she was desperate to be valedictorian. She only meant to give him a small dose but gave him too much. She even convinced her father to cover it up. Kato, upon hearing the confession, sneak attacks and kills Rian. However, Rian falls in Erin's arms and thus, she gets the time, which angers Kato.

Kato taunts Erin, who has always been the quiet one. However, Erin gains the confidence she desperately needed and incapacitates Kato, who gives his final words as his timer goes off and explodes. Erin’s vest glows, revealing a message that reads: "All your friends are dead! Have a nice life!"

A mid-credit scene shows Erin escaping to the road and flagging down a passing car. However, he sees her gun and drives away. Erin screams, and then slowly begins to smile.

Cast

Production
Director Alastair Orr cited Kinji Fukusaku's Battle Royale, Kevin Smith, Greg McLean, and James Wan's Saw as influences for making the film.

The film was shot in the summer of 2019 at Appelsbosch Farm in Swellendam, South Africa. Filming took place only at night as the film is set throughout the course of one night. During the days, the core cast of the nine friends would bond over drinks and play Laser Tag as they had never worked with each other before. Reine Swart said that the idea of them bonding was that of Cameron Scott, who is the youngest cast member (at age 24 at the time) and to this day, the cast remains friends.

Reception
The website's critics consensus reads: "Triggereds combustible premise largely fizzles out thanks to thinly written characters and a story that's heavier on fast paced violence than actual ideas." According to Metacritic, which sampled the opinions of five critics and calculated a score of 48 out of 100, the film received "mixed or average reviews".

Ben Kenigsberg of the New York Times gave the film three stars, stating "its relentlessness, and the gusto with which it embraces its mandate to make a mess, is tough to resist.". Brian Tallerico of RogerEbert.com gave it 2.5 stars. Mark Hanson of Slant Magazine rated it 1.5 stars. Calling the characters "mostly bland", Frank Sheck of The Hollywood Reporter said of the film: "Once the outlandish premise is established, there's little to enjoy in the increasing body count".

References

External links
 
 

2020 comedy horror films
2020 films
2020s English-language films
English-language South African films
Films about death games
Films set in forests
South African comedy horror films